Laodicea ad Libanum ("Laodicea by Mount Lebanon"),  also transliterated as Laodiceia or Laodikeia; also Cabrosa, Scabrosa and Cabiosa Laodiceia – was an ancient Hellenistic city on the Orontes in Coele-Syria, the remains of which are found approximately 25 km southwest of Homs, Syria (at Kadesh). The city is mentioned by Strabo (xvi. p. 755) as the commencement of the Marsyas Campus, which extended along the west side of the Orontes, near its source. It is called Cabiosa Laodiceia by Ptolemy (Kabiôsa Laodikeia, v. 15), and gives its name to a district Laodicene (Laodikênê), in which he places two other towns, Paradisus (Paradeisos) and Jabruda (Iabmouda). Pliny (v. 23), among other people of Syria, reckons ad orientem Laodicenos, qui ad Libanum cognominantur.

Laodicea ad Libanum is a titular see of the Catholic Church, Laodicensis ad Libanum; the seat was held by bishop Paul Bassim.

See also 
 List of ancient Greek cities
 Kadesh – Ancient city (abandoned) in same location

References

External links
Hazlitt, Classical Gazetteer, "Laodicea"
Smith, William (editor); Dictionary of Greek and Roman Geography, "Laodiceia", London, (1854)

Hellenistic sites in Syria
Seleucid colonies
Roman sites in Syria
Catholic titular sees in Asia
Former populated places in Syria